Henry "Hank" Totten (September 2, 1824 – October 24, 1899) was an American businessman and politician.

Born in Congress Township, Wayne County, Ohio, Totten moved to Barton, Washington County, Wisconsin Territory in 1846. He then settled in Waukesha, Wisconsin and was a merchant. He served as sealer of weights and measurements. 

In 1870, Totten served in the Wisconsin State Assembly as a Democrat.

In 1879, Totten moved to Chicago, Illinois and worked for a wholesale business. He later settled in Winnetka, Illinois, where he died in 1899 after suffering from a long illness.

Notes

External links

1824 births
1899 deaths
People from Wayne County, Ohio
People from Barton, Wisconsin
Politicians from Waukesha, Wisconsin
People from Winnetka, Illinois
Businesspeople from Chicago
Businesspeople from Wisconsin
19th-century American politicians
19th-century American businesspeople
Democratic Party members of the Wisconsin State Assembly